Gary W. Hanson is the current chairman of the South Dakota Public Utilities Commission. He previously served two terms as Mayor of Sioux Falls from 1995 to 2003, six years on the Sioux Falls City Council as utilities commissioner from 1989 to 1995, and three terms in the South Dakota Senate from the 13th district representing Minnehaha County from 1983 to 1988.

External links
South Dakota Public Utilities Commission biography
South Dakota Legislative Research Council Historical Listing

References

South Dakota state senators
Living people
Year of birth missing (living people)